Mundt is a surname. Notable people with the surname include:

Ethan Mundt, American drag queen
Inge Mundt, German rower
Karl Earl Mundt (1900–1974), American educator and politician
Kate Mundt (1930–2004), Danish film actress
Kristina Mundt (born 1966), German rower
Lori Ann Mundt (born 1971) Canadian volleyball player
Miel Mundt (1880–1949), Dutch football player
Theodor Mundt (1808–1861), German critic and novelist
Todd Mundt (born 1970), American Basketball player

Fictional characters
Hans-Dieter Mundt, fictional character in Call for the Dead and The Spy Who Came In From The Cold
Karl "Madman" Mundt, fictional character in Joel and Ethan Coen's Barton Fink